Imagneto Dance Company is a Lagos-based dance group owned and founded by Kaffy, a Nigerian dance instructor and choreographer. The group is well known for breaking the Guinness Book of World Record for "Longest Dance Party" at the Nokia Silverbird Danceathon in 2006.

Awards and nominations

See also

 List of companies of Nigeria

References

External links

Dance companies
Entertainment companies of Nigeria
Companies based in Lagos
Musical groups from Lagos
Performing arts in Lagos